Jondan Y. Salvador (born October 12, 1980) is a Filipino professional basketball player who last played for the Marikina Shoemasters of the Maharlika Pilipinas Basketball League (MPBL). He was drafted by the Purefoods Chunkee Giants in the 2005 PBA draft. He was a former Mythical Five awardee with the CSB Blazers during his NCAA years.

Professional career

Purefoods / B-Meg (2005–2011)
Salvador was drafted by the Purefoods Chunkee Giants fourth overall in the 2005 PBA draft.

Air21 Express / Barako Bull Energy (2011–2012)
In 2011, he was traded along with Niño Canaleta to the Air21 Express for Joe Devance.

Powerade Tigers / GlobalPort Batang Pier (2012–2014)
In May 2012, Salvador was traded by Barako Bull to the Powerade Tigers in exchange for Doug Kramer.

Return to Barako Bull (2014–2015)
In 2014, Salvador was traded to Barako Bull in exchange for Mark Isip. Salvador came back to the Barako Bull team after playing for them in the 2011–12 season.

Pacquiao Powervit Pilipinas Aguilas (2015)
In October 2015, Salvador was signed by the Pacquiao Powervit Pilipinas Aguilas (now the Pilipinas MX3 Kings) of the ABL to play as one of the team's locals. However, in December 2015, Salvador, along with Emmerson Oreta, Charles Mammie, Sunday Salvacion, Chad Alonzo, and Adrian Celada were released by the Pilipinas MX3 Kings after a roster overhaul.

Career statistics

Correct as of February 15, 2016

Season-by-season averages

|-
| align=left | 
| align=left | Purefoods
| 26 || 26.5 || .492 || .000 || .674 || 7.1 || 1.0 || .5 || .2 || 7.8
|-
| align=left | 
| align=left | Purefoods
| 31 || 21.1 || .454 || .000 || .500 || 5.8 || .5 || .2 || .1 || 4.0
|-
| align=left | 
| align=left | Purefoods
| 50 || 18.9 || .516 || .000 || .788 || 6.0 || .5 || .4 || .2 || 4.6
|-
| align=left | 
| align=left | Purefoods
| 16 || 13.5 || .342 || .000 || .400 || 4.3 || .3 || .4 || .0 || 1.8
|-
| align=left | 
| align=left | Purefoods / B-Meg Derby Ace
| 24 || 8.7 || .406 || .000 || .818 || 2.5 || .2 || .1 || .0 || 1.5
|-
| align=left | 
| align=left | B-Meg Derby Ace / Air21
| 34 || 17.2 || .478 || .000 || .571 || 5.7 || .8 || .2 || .2 || 3.8
|-
| align=left | 
| align=left | Barako Bull / Powerade
| 32 || 17.2 || .589 || .000 || .533 || 4.7 || .9 || .2 || .1 || 4.4
|-
| align=left | 
| align=left | GlobalPort
| 33 || 18.2 || .500 || .000 || .513 || 5.6 || .9 || .3 || .0 || 3.8
|-
| align=left | 
| align=left | GlobalPort
| 34 || 12.3 || .485 || .000 || .588 || 3.9 || .5 || .1 || .1 || 2.2
|-
| align=left | 
| align=left | Barako Bull
| 25 || 10.3 || .407 || .000 || .000 || 3.0 || .6 || .3 || .0 || .9
|-
| align=left | Career
| align=left | 
| 305 || 16.8 || .490 || .000 || .611 || 5.0 || .6 || .3 || .1 || 3.7

Personal life
Salvador owns a car financing business with his family in his hometown Parañaque. In February 2016, Salvador, with his cousin and four others were involved in a scam that involves tricking new car owners into borrowing their new cars for a car-renting service where the car owners are promised up to ₱40,000 ($840) per month, only to say that their car was "lost" but was instead allegedly given to Salvador, which he in turn uses in his own car business.

However, Salvador and the other accusers has denied he has any knowledge about this.

References

External links
 Player profile at PBA-Online!

1980 births
Living people
Benilde Blazers basketball players
Power forwards (basketball)
People from Parañaque
Filipino men's basketball players
Basketball players from Metro Manila
Air21 Express players
Barako Bull Energy players
NorthPort Batang Pier players
Powerade Tigers players
Magnolia Hotshots players
Centers (basketball)
Maharlika Pilipinas Basketball League players
Magnolia Hotshots draft picks